Mudpit is a Canadian television series created by Jamie Waese that blends both CGI animation and live action formats. The series premiered on Teletoon in Canada on January 5, 2012 and ended on April 11, 2013. It aired as part of Teletoon's "Can't Miss Thursdays" block. The series was produced by Cookie Jar Entertainment.

Plot 
Mudpit follows the adventures of four teens who form the eponymous band, Mudpit, as they try to earn a recording contract through competing in the Japanese massively multiplayer online role-playing game Muzika.

Each episode in the series consists of a challenge proposed by Slime, and the band's attempts to win the challenge; during this one of the band members learns an important life lesson.  Each episode concludes with an original song sung by the band members.

Characters

Main characters 
 Reese (Vas Saranga) is the founder and leader of Mudpit, and the band's lead guitarist. After being expelled from his brother band Tragic Ballerina, Reese and his childhood friend Geneva enter Muzika in an attempt to win fame. While in Muzika, he is known as Dodge.
 Geneva (Carleigh Beverly) is Reese's childhood friend, and the band's drummer.  She is the writer of most of the band's music, and enters Muzika in order to express herself to a worldwide audience.  Being Reese's close friend, she quits Tragic Ballerina as a sign of solidarity. It is hinted that she might have a small crush on Liam. While in Muzika, she is simply known as G.
 Mikey (Daniel Magder) is Geneva's younger brother, and the band's bassist.  He is experienced at video games, and had been playing Muzika as a solo act before Reese and Geneva started to play.  He enters Muzika in search of fame, and the prospects of being a ladies' man that comes with it.  While in Muzika, he is known as Booch.
 Liam (Jesse Rath) is the band's lead singer and guitarist. Though he is a musical school prodigy, he comes from a very strict upbringing and, because of this, is socially awkward and inept at video games.  However, he is caring at heart, and is supportive of his three friends. It is hinted that he may have a crush on Geneva. While in Muzika, he is known as Lamb.

Supporting characters 
 Kyle (Kjartan Hewitt) is Reese's stepbrother, and was the lead singer in Tragic Ballerina before kicking Reese out of the band after he had a failed attempt at a crowd dive.  With the departure of Reese and Geneva, the three remaining members reinvent themselves as the Spoilers.  Reese and Kyle often have a combative relationship, with Kyle often attempting to prank or one-up his stepbrother.  While in Muzika, he is known by the name Darkrider.
 Fitzy (Jeff Douglas) is the owner of the "Game & Grub", a restaurant and smoothie bar in Toronto where Reese and Geneva is introduced to the world of Muzika.  The restaurant also contains a number of game rooms where players may rent out in order to play Muzika.  Fitzy had been part of a 90s boy band known as Barry and the Boys, and had apparently saved his money and moved on from the music world to open the Game & Grub.  As such, he often acts as a mentor to Mudpit and other bands that may play Muzika there.
 Slime (Robert Tinkler) is the host of Muzika, who acts as the judge in the various musical challenges that he imposes on Muzika players.  As a computer character, he notably only refers to all of the human characters solely by their Muzika names.  He is often harsh and condescending towards the various bands, and Mudpit in particular, he does grudgingly respect their accomplishments in the end.

Other characters 
 The Ava-tarts are an all-female band centered on its lead singer, Sweetie (Meghan Heffern).  They had attempted to recruit Geneva away from Mudpit to capitalize on their seemingly chauvinistic behaviour, only for Geneva to go back to Mudpit when they tried to take her identity away by forcing her to change her name to "S" and making her play the triangle, so as to not overshadow Sweetie.
 Crush the Zebra are a punk rock band considered to be completely inept at video games, and is often considered to be "the worst band in Muzika".
 The Prickly Pears are a country band whose band members are shaped like cacti.  They eventually win the fans needed to win a road trip challenge, but are defeated in the last moment when Mudpit performs an impromptu concert in the middle of the street to win the challenge.

Episodes

Season 1 (2012)

Season 2 (2013)

References 

2011 Canadian television series debuts
2013 Canadian television series endings
2010s Canadian animated television series
Canadian television series with live action and animation
Television series by Cookie Jar Entertainment
Television series by DHX Media
Canadian children's animated comedy television series
Canadian children's animated musical television series
English-language television shows
Canadian computer-animated television series
Teletoon original programming
Teen animated television series